Club Tijuana Femenil is a Mexican women's football club based in Tijuana, Baja California. The club has been the female section of Club Tijuana since 2017. The team will play in the Liga MX Femenil, which was scheduled to begin in September 2017.

On 18 February 2020, Tijuana midfielder Valentina Oviedo, the Mexican-born daughter of former Colombian international footballer Frankie Oviedo, was called up to the Colombia women's national under-20 team. It marked the first time a player from the Liga MX Femenil was called up to a foreign national team.

Personnel

Coaching staff

Players

Current squad

References

Liga MX Femenil teams
Club Tijuana (women)
Association football clubs established in 2017
Association football in Tijuana
Sports teams in Tijuana
Football clubs in Baja California
Women's association football clubs in Mexico
2017 establishments in Mexico